Chiang Mai Main Line is a main line of the Northern Line operated by State Railway of Thailand that connects between Hua Lamphong railway station in the central and Chiang Mai railway station in the north, passing through many provinces. It is the second longest railway line in Thailand, after Su-ngai Kolok Main Line. Notable services include the Nakhon Phing Express, the first class train serving the line. Many accidents have occurred on the line in recent years, prompting renovation work to commence on the track in late 2013, finally reopening on 2 December 2013.

History

Timeline

Name changes

Services

Notable railway stations

 Bang Sue Junction - The largest freight yard in Thailand and hence the Phahonyothin main freight terminal. There is also a locomotive depot.
 Ayutthaya station - Northern Bangkok suburban station. High passenger revenue, second only to Bangkok station.
 Ban Phachi Junction - A major junction, where the Northern and Northeastern lines separate.
 Lop Buri Station - The end of northern Bangkok suburban service; a historic military town.
 Nakhon Sawan Station - Nakhon Sawan Main Station, Nong Pling station until 1956.
 Phichit Station- Phichit Main Station
 Phitsanulok Station - Phitsanulok Main station, town with the famous Phra Phuttha Chinnarat
 Ban Dara Junction - Junction for Sawankhalok Line
 Uttaradit Station - Main station for Uttaradit Province.
 Sila At Station - Depot on the Northern Line. Refueling station and up trains will be cut at this station
 Den Chai Station - the dropping point for Phrae with a proposal for a junction for Den Chai-Chiang Rai route
 Nakhon Lampang Station - Depot on the Northern Line.  Train will be cut further if going North to Chiang Mai.
 Khun Tan Station - Station in the mountains, base point and entrance for Doi Khuntan National Park. Railway bungalows also situated here
 Lamphun Station - Main station for Lamphun Province
 Chiang Mai station - Terminus

See also
 Sawankhalok Line

References

Railway lines in Thailand
Metre gauge railways in Thailand